Advanced Weapons and Equipment India Limited (AWE) is an Indian state-owned defence company, headquartered in Kanpur, India established in 2021 as part of the restructuring and corporatisation of the Ordnance Factory Board into seven different Public Sector Undertakings. AWE primarily manufactures Small arms and artillery guns for the use of the Indian Armed Forces, foreign militaries and domestic civilian use.

Factory

AWE consists of the following seven factories of the erstwhile Ordnance Factory Board:

Skill Development
Ordnance Factories Institute of Learning Ishapore
OFIL Ishapore is the training institute under the Advance Weapon & Equipments India Ltd., a Govt. of India Enterprise, Under ministry of Defence, engaged in imparting & upgrading technical and managerial skills.

The Institute came into existence under Lt. Col. L. De Lenfestey RA CIA during British rule in 1920, the then Superintendent of Rifle Factory, Ishapore and has always enjoyed a place of pride amongst the fraternity of Ordnance Factories as well as in the Industry for its quality of training and calibre of alumni who have achieved very high positions in the Govt. and corporate world.

OFIL Ishapore is a recipient of prestigious Golden Peacock National Training award awarded by Institute of Directors in 1997 & 2005 and was Runner Up in 2002. 

OFIL Ishapore also boasts of Hostel facility for the participating officials and others providing boarding and lodging. AC & NON-AC rooms with a total capacity of 116 and recreational facilities in terms of Indoor and Outdoor sports.

See also
Other PSUs formed from Ordnance Factory Board:-
Armoured Vehicles Nigam Limited (AVANI), Chennai
Gliders India Limited (GIL), Kanpur
India Optel Limited (IOL), Dehradun
Munitions India Limited (MIL), Pune
Troop Comforts Limited (TCL), Kanpur
Yantra India Limited (YIL), Nagpur

References

Defence companies of India
Government-owned companies of India